The adjective occipital, in zoology, means pertaining to the occiput (rear of the skull).

Occipital is a descriptor for several areas of animal and human anatomy.
External occipital protuberance
 Internal occipital crest
 Greater occipital nerve
 Lesser occipital nerve
 Occipital artery
 Occipital bone
 Occipital bun
 Occipital condyle
 Occipital groove
 Occipital lobe
 Occipital plane
 Occipital pole
 Occipital ridge
 Occipital scales
 Occipital triangle
 Occipital vein
 Parieto-occipital sulcus
 PGO (Ponto-geniculo-occipital) waves
 Preoccipital notch

References

Anatomical terminology